Tiger with a Tortoise or Tiger Playing with a Tortoise is an 1862 oil on canvas painting by Eugène Delacroix. It was sold by Christie's in New York for $9,875,000 in May 2018.

References

1862 paintings
Paintings by Eugène Delacroix
Tigers in art
Turtles in art